VPA may refer to:

 ICAO airline code for Danube Wings
 Valproic acid, chemical compound that has found clinical use as an anticonvulsant and mood-stabilizing drug
 Vermont Principals' Association, governing body of Vermont's high school athletics
 Very powerful acid
 Vietnam People's Army, official name of the armed forces of the Socialist Republic of Vietnam
 Virtual Payment Address, a type of ID in the Unified Payments Interface
 Virtual personal assistant, a synonym for intelligent personal assistant
 Visibly pushdown automaton, an automaton model in computer science
 Voluntary Partnership Agreement, bilateral trade agreement between the EU and some timber producing countries.
 Volunteer Pilots Association, American Public Benefit Flying (PBF) group